Iwaz may refer to:
 Eihwaz, proto-Germanic word for Yew
 ‘Iwaz, alternate name of Evaz, a city in Iran